Agnes Kay Eppers Reynders is a road cyclist from Bolivia. She represented her nation at the 2000 and 2005 UCI Road World Championships. She also competed in the triathlon at the 1999, 2003 and 2007 Pan American Games.

References

External links
 profile at Procyclingstats.com

Bolivian female cyclists
Bolivian female triathletes
Triathletes at the 1999 Pan American Games
Triathletes at the 2003 Pan American Games
Triathletes at the 2007 Pan American Games
Pan American Games competitors for Bolivia
Living people
Place of birth missing (living people)
South American Games bronze medalists for Bolivia
South American Games medalists in triathlon
1971 births
Competitors at the 2002 South American Games